= Gisostola quentini =

Scientific classification
- Domain: Eukaryota
- Kingdom: Animalia
- Phylum: Arthropoda
- Class: Insecta
- Order: Coleoptera
- Suborder: Polyphaga
- Infraorder: Cucujiformia
- Family: Cerambycidae
- Genus: Gisostola
- Species: G. quentini

Binomial name
- Gisostola quentini Martins & Galileo, 1989

Species of beetle

Gisostola quentini is a species of beetle in the family Cerambycidae. It was described by Martins and Galileo in 1989. It is known from Brazil.
